Orlyak, Dobrich Province is a village in Tervel Municipality, Dobrich Province, in northeastern Bulgaria.

Demography 
The following table shows the change of the population during the last four decades.

References

Villages in Dobrich Province